The 1999–2000 season was Port Vale's 88th season of football in the English Football League, and sixth successive season in the First Division. Vale suffered relegation in 23rd place, some thirteen points adrift of safety. They also exited the FA Cup at the Third Round, and were knocked out of the League Cup at the First Round by fourth tier Chester City for the second consecutive season. The club spent nothing on transfers, but sold young players for some £1.5 million – despite this the club was heading towards bankruptcy. The club continued to gain one generation of players at the expense of the successful '90s generation; Martin Foyle, Paul Musselwhite and Ian Bogie departing, with fresh talent such as Micky Cummins and Mark Goodlad arriving in their place.

Overview

First Division
The pre-season saw Brian Horton sign Jeff Minton (Brighton & Hove Albion), Tommy Widdrington (Grimsby Town), and Steve Rimmer (Manchester City) on free transfers. He also took Andy Oakes in on loan from Derby County and Matt Glennon from Bolton Wanderers as back-up goalkeepers, and striker Martin Aldridge on loan from Blackpool.

The season started with a goalless draw at Ewood Park with Blackburn Rovers, but soon went downhill with two defeats. Vale then entered inconsistent form, winning three and losing three in a run of six games. However just two points from seven October games indicated Vale's future. Also in the month, striker Marcus Bent, signed by John Rudge nine months earlier for £375,000, was sold to Sheffield United for a bargain £300,000, and was later sold on by the "Blades" for a £1.7 million profit. The club set a record on 5 September, when just 3,737 turned up to see a 3–0 win over Grimsby Town – a division record low for a television match. The Vale ended the year in solid form, unbeaten in seven games, despite just two victories (over rivals Crewe Alexandra and against Sheffield United at Bramall Lane). In December, Carl Griffiths was sold back to former club Leyton Orient for £100,000.

In January, Horton signed defender Sagi Burton (Sheffield United) on a free transfer, and signed Martin Bullock and Gareth Taylor on one month loans from Barnsley and Manchester City respectively. Controversially, he also sold promising young defender Anthony Gardner to Tottenham Hotspur for £1 million. The next month David Healy would arrive on loan from Manchester United for the remainder of the season. Also, former international Ville Viljanen became the first Fin to play for the club, when he joined from Västra Frölunda IF. In March, Horton made two key signings, bringing two young players that would be with the club for several years to come: Irish midfielder Micky Cummins (Middlesbrough) and goalkeeper Mark Goodlad (Nottingham Forest). He also sold Tony Butler to West Bromwich Albion for £140,000. During this transfer activity Vale won just once in a sequence of seventeen games. A 2–0 win over Portsmouth on 1 April raised hopes of Vale escaping the drop, but Horton's side gained just three points in their final eight games, thus dooming Vale to third tier football.

They finished in 23rd place with 36 points, a massive thirteen points away from the safety of West Bromwich Albion, and only ahead of Swindon Town on goals scored. With just seven victories, they had the fewest wins in the division. Tony Rougier only needed nine goals in all competitions to become the club's top-scorer. The relegation meant that Brian Horton lost his 'proud record' of never being relegated as a player or as a manager.

At the end of the season numerous players were allowed to leave on free transfers: eight-year club veteran goalkeeper Paul Musselwhite (Hull City); five-year club favourite Ian Bogie (Kidderminster Harriers); Wayne Corden (Mansfield Town); Stewart Talbot (Rotherham United); Mark Snijders (AFC '34); Kevin Pilkington (Aberystwyth Town); and Steve Rimmer (Marine). Legendary striker Martin Foyle also retired, after nine years as Vale's star striker. Simon Barker also retired, at the age of 35. Meanwhile, the club's board increased to five members: Bill Bell (chairman), Andrew Bellfield, Paul Wright, Neil Hughes, and Charles Machin.

Finances
The club's shirt sponsors were Tunstall Assurance.

Cup competitions
In the FA Cup, Vale lost 2–0 to Premier League outfit Leeds United at Elland Road, to exit the competition at the Third Round. Just 11,912 turned up for the game, after the Vale board refused to allow a price reduction.

In the League Cup, for the second successive season Third Division Chester City knocked the Vale out at the First Round. In the 2–1 defeat at the Deva Stadium both sides finished the game with ten men, and as the return leg was a 4–4 draw, Chester achieved a 6–5 aggregate win.

League table

Results
Port Vale's score comes first

Football League First Division

Results by matchday

Matches

FA Cup

League Cup

Player statistics

Appearances

Top scorers

Transfers

Transfers in

Transfers out

Loans in

References
Specific

General
Soccerbase

Port Vale F.C. seasons
Port Vale